Mauritius is a religiously diverse nation, with Hinduism being the most widely professed faith. People of Indian descent (Indo-Mauritian) follow mostly Hinduism and Islam. The Franco-Mauritians, Creoles and Sino-Mauritians follow Christianity. A minority of Sino-Mauritians also follow Buddhism and other Chinese-related religions. According to the 2011 census made by Statistics Mauritius, Hinduism is the major religion at 48.54%, followed by Christianity at 32.71% (with Catholicism as the largest Christian denomination at 26.26%), followed by Islam 17.30% and Buddhism 0.18% in terms of number of adherents.

Legal status 
The constitution prohibits discrimination on religious grounds and provides for freedom to practice or change one's religion. The government provides money to the Roman Catholic Church, Church of England, Presbyterian Church of Mauritius, Seventh-day Adventists, Hindus, and Muslims according to their numbers in the census in addition to tax-exempt status. Other religious groups can register and be tax-exempt but receive no subsidy.  Religious public holidays are the Hindu festivals of Maha Shivaratree, Ougadi, Thaipoosam Cavadee, Ganesh Chaturthi, and Diwali; the Christian festivals of Assumption and Christmas; and the Muslim festival of Eid al-Fitr.

Dharmic religions

Hinduism

Hinduism originally came to Mauritius mainly through Indians who worked as indentured labourers on the island following the abolition of slavery.  Today, Hinduism is a major religion in Mauritius, representing 48.54% of the total population of the country according to the 2011 census carried out by Statistics Mauritius. This makes Mauritius the country having the highest percentage of Hindus in Africa and third highest percentage of Hindus in the world after Nepal and India, respectively.

One of the biggest festivals on the island is Mahasivaratri, or the 'Great Night of Siva'. During this annual Hindu celebration, which takes place in the months of February and March, four to nine days of ceremony and fasting lead up to an all-night vigil of Siva worship and Ganesha worship.

Buddhism
About 0.4% of the population of Mauritius adheres to Buddhism. It is practiced by a significant minority of Sino-Mauritians.

Abrahamic religions

Christianity

Catholics make up 83% of Mauritius's Christians (26% of the total population or 324,811).  The other recognized and subsidized religions include the Church of England which on the island is the Diocese of Mauritius in the Church of the Province of the Indian Ocean which has 2,788 members according to the census; the Presbyterian Church of Mauritius with 501 members, and the Seventh-day Adventists with 4,428 members.  Other Christian denominations include three Pentecostal groups Assembly of God with 8,692, Mission Salut et Guérison with 3,731, and Pentecotiste Church with 6,817.  About 47,774 just listed Christian on the census.     Jehovah's Witnesses have 2,173 members. The Church of Jesus Christ of Latter-day Saints reports 471 members in 2 congregations; the census reports 40.

Christianity came to Mauritius with the first inhabitants, the Dutch. However, the Dutch abandoned the island in 1710. The French brought Christianity again when they arrived in 1715. From 1723, there was a law whereby all slaves coming to the island must be baptised Catholic. This law does not seem to have been strictly adhered to. After they had taken Mauritius from the French during the Napoleonic Wars, the British tried to turn Mauritius Protestant during the 1840s and 1850s.

Franco-Mauritians, usually having the same religion and denomination as the Creoles, have sometimes emphasised their differences from the Creoles by practising more traditionally, for instance celebrating Mass in Latin. Today Christianity is practiced by 31.7% of the total population.

Islam

Islam is practiced by 17.3% of the Mauritian population. Approximately 95 percent of these are Sunni Muslims, having an understanding of the Urdu language. Within the Muslim community, there are three distinct ethnicities that exist, notably the Memons and the Surtees (who are rich merchants who came from Kutch and Surat province of Gujarat in India), then the "Hindi Calcattias" who came to Mauritius as indentured labourers from Bihar. 

Other languages include Bhojpuri, Gujarati, and Tamil. Among the Shi'a minority, some have their origins in different parts of South Asia, while others are adherents of the Shia Ismaili sect from East Africa. The majority of Shias are Ithnā‘ashariyyah with small Ismaili sect.

The first purpose-built mosque in Mauritius is the Camp des Lascars Mosque in around 1805. It is now officially known as the Al-Aqsa Mosque. The Jummah Mosque in Port Louis was built in the 1850s and is often described as one of the most beautiful religious building in Mauritius by the Ministry of Tourism's guide. There are many smaller mosques in the towns and villages. The highest concentration of Muslims is found in the capital Port Louis, predominantly in the Plaine Verte, Ward IV, Valle Pitot and Camp Yoloff neighborhood.

Most people of the Muslim community follows the Sunni belief.  However, there are also the Shia and Tablighi Jamaat. According to the 2011 census, there were 1265 Ahmadis. The Islamic Authority recognized by the Government is Jummah Mosque Port Louis.

Baháʼí Faith
The Baháʼí Faith was introduced to the Mauritius by Ottilie Rhein in 1953.  For opening a new territory to the Faith during the Ten Year Crusade, Ottilie Rhein was designated a Knight of Bahá'u'lláh by Shoghi Effendi, the Guardian of the Baháʼí Faith.  According to the 2011 government census, there were 639 Baháʼís in Mauritius, and the Association of Religion Data Archives (relying on World Christian Database) states there were 23,748 Baháʼís in Mauritius in 2010.

Others
Confucianism and Taoism are also practiced by small number of Mauritian population. In 2011, there were only 43 Jews in Mauritius.

See also
Mauritius
Christianity in Mauritius
Islam in Mauritius
Hinduism in Mauritius
History of the Jews in Mauritius

References